The Rajkot–Somnath Passenger is a Passenger train belonging to Western Railway zone that runs between  and . It is currently being operated with 59421/59423 train numbers on a daily basis.

Average speed and frequency 

59421/Rajkot Somnath Passenger runs with an average speed of 37 km/hr and covers 190 km in 5h 10m. 
59423/Somnath Rajkot Passenger runs with an average speed of 37 km/hr and covers 190 km in 5h 10m.

Route and halts 

The important halts of the train are:

Coach composition

The train has standard ICF rakes with max speed of 110 kmph. The train consists of 11 coaches:

 9 General Unreserved
 2 Seating cum Luggage Rake

Traction

Both trains are hauled by a Ratlam Loco Shed-based WDM-3A diesel locomotive from Rajkot to Somnath and vice versa.

Rake sharing

The train shares its rake with 59423/59424 Rajkot–Veraval Passenger and 19569/19570 Rajkot–Veraval Express.

See also 

 Veraval Junction railway station
 Rajkot Junction railway station
 Rajkot–Veraval Express
 Rajkot–Veraval Passenger

Notes

References

External links 

 59423/Veraval–Somnath Passenger India Rail Info
 59424/Somnath–Veraval Passenger India Rail Info

Transport in Rajkot
Transport in Veraval
Rail transport in Gujarat
Slow and fast passenger trains in India